Weiz is surname of:
  (born 1954), German female singer
  (1739–1815), German physician and Chronist
 Herbert Weiz (born 1924), German politician
  (born 1949), German musician and graphic artist
 Yosef Weiz (Weitz) (1890–1972), the director of the Land and Afforestation Department of the Jewish National Fund

See also 
 Weiz (disambiguation)

German-language surnames